Picture Snatcher is a 1933 American pre-code drama film starring James Cagney as a gangster who decides to quit to pursue his dream.

Plot
After getting out of prison, Danny Kean (James Cagney) shocks the gang he leads by quitting. He wants his first stint in jail to be his last, and he has always dreamed of becoming a newspaper reporter. He hands leadership over to Jerry "the Mug" (Ralf Harolde), even though he suspects Jerry sold him out.

Al McLean (Ralph Bellamy), the city editor of the sleazy Graphic News, had offered him a job when he got out, but when Danny shows up, Al is reluctant to take him on. Just then, Al's boss, Grover (Robert Barrat), laments that nobody has gotten a photograph of Hennessy (G. Pat Collins), a fireman who responded to a fire at his own house, found the dead bodies of his wife and her lover, and barricaded himself in the ruins with a gun. Danny sneaks in, pretends to be an insurance adjuster to lull Hennessy's suspicions, and steals his wedding picture. As a result, Danny is made a staff photographer.

When some journalism students take a tour of the Graphic News (an example of everything not to do), Danny is attracted to Pat Nolan (Patricia Ellis). She goes out on a date with him, much to the annoyance of "sob sister" reporter Allison (Alice White), who makes it quite clear that she wants Danny too, though she is Al's girlfriend. A complication arises when Danny discovers that not only is Pat's father, Casey (Robert Emmett O'Connor), a police lieutenant, but Casey was the one who shot him (six times) and caught him. Naturally, Casey orders his daughter to stay away from Danny. However, Al gets him to change his mind by arranging for another newspaper to print a flattering story about him that gets him promoted to captain.

When a woman is scheduled to be executed at Sing Sing, the Graphic News is the only paper not invited. Danny steals the invitation of another reporter, but finds that it is not transferable. However, Captain Nolan is in charge of the proceedings and lets him in. Casey takes a picture of the woman in the electric chair using a hidden camera strapped to his ankle (echoing the real-life photo taken of murderer Ruth Snyder in 1928). The other reporters find out and inform the police. A wild car chase ensues, but Danny delivers his prize to Grover and is handsomely rewarded. The photograph is printed on the front page. However, Pat breaks up with him after her father is demoted as a result.

Al arranges for Danny to hide from the angry police at Allison's apartment, as she will be out of town covering another story. She returns early and eagerly embraces an uninterested Danny. Al comes in at that moment, and Danny loses his best friend.

Danny takes to drinking to drown his sorrows. Al tracks him down and apologizes; he has found out about Allison. Al announces he has quit drinking (which had lost him jobs at all the respectable newspapers) and quit the News. They find out that Jerry the Mug has killed two policemen during a robbery and is the target of a massive manhunt. They realize that if Danny can find him, the scoop will get them jobs at any paper.

Danny tracks Jerry down and pretends to be on his side. The police find his hideout without Danny's help, and a fierce shootout ensues. Danny secretly takes photographs of Jerry's last moments as he's being shot. When the police break in, Danny claims that he was working undercover for Nolan, which earns Nolan a promotion back to captain. Danny and Pat are reunited, and the inside story is Danny and Al's passport to jobs on the Daily Record.

Cast

Home media
Picture Snatcher was released on DVD by Warner Bros. in 2008, which also featured an audio commentary.

External links

1933 films
1933 drama films
American black-and-white films
1930s English-language films
Films about photojournalists
Films directed by Lloyd Bacon
Warner Bros. films
American drama films
1930s American films